Lithops otzeniana is a species of succulent plant under the genus Lithops. It belongs to the family Aizoecea. L. otzeniana is native to areas of Southern Africa. It derives its name from M. Otzen, who invited its discoverer, Professor G.C. Nel, on the trip in which he discovered it.

Description 
The succulent plant L. otzeniana forms usually in small groups of 2-5 heads, with each head consisting of a pair of thick leaves. The leaves are olive-green to grey, and have a saw-tooth-edged patch of darker color in the center of each leaf. Flowers are yellow with a white center; they sprout from the center of the two leaves on each head.

References 

otzeniana